Alesha's Street Dance Stars is a competition aired on the CBBC Channel and presented by Alesha Dixon. The judges are Turbo, Kenrick Sandy and Lizzie Gough. Dance crews of young street dancers compete in a series of auditions, rounds and finals with one crew winning both the title of Alesha's Street Dance Stars and a money-cannot-buy-prize. The first series aired from 22 August 2011 to 2 September 2011. The second series began airing on 20 August 2012.

References

2010s British children's television series
2011 British television series debuts
2012 British television series endings
Dance competition television shows